The Mother of His Children is a 1920 American  silent drama film directed by Edward LeSaint and starring Gladys Brockwell, William Scott, Frank Leigh, Nigel De Brulier, Golda Madden, and Nancy Caswell. The film was released by Fox Film Corporation in April 1920.

Cast
Gladys Brockwell as Princess Yve
William Scott as Richard Arnold
Frank Leigh as Count Tolstoff
Nigel De Brulier as Hadji
Golda Madden as Beatrice Arnold
Nancy Caswell as Helen
Jean Eaton as Bobbie

Preservation
The film is now considered lost.

See also
1937 Fox vault fire

References

External links

1920 drama films
Silent American drama films
1920 films
American silent feature films
American black-and-white films
Fox Film films
Lost American films
1920 lost films
Lost drama films
Films directed by Edward LeSaint
1920s American films